Golden Days Diamond Nights is the second and final studio album by the American rock band Nite City, a band that was formed by former Doors' member and keyboardist Ray Manzarek. As with the band's self titled debut and live album, entitled Starwood Club, Los Angeles. 02/23/1977, Golden Days Diamond Nights sold poorly and the group disbanded shortly after the album's release.

The album's title is taken from  lyrics to "Get Up and Dance," a song from the Doors' Full Circle, and "Perfumed Garden," a song from Manzarek's solo album The Whole Thing Started with Rock & Roll Now It's Out of Control.

Track listing

 "Riding on the Wings of Love" (Jimmy Hunter, Paul Warren, Ray Manzarek) - 3:38
 "The Dreamer" (Paul Warren, Ray Manzarek) - 6:21
 "Holy Music" (Champion, Paul Warren) - 5:04
 "Ain't Got the Time" (Nigel Harrison, Ray Manzarek) - 3:13
 "Die High" (Paul Warren) - 4:49
 "Blinded by Love" (Noah James, Paul Warren) - 4:39
 "Barcelona" (Nigel Harrison) - 3:29
 "America" (Ray Manzarek) - 8:33

Personnel
Nite City 
 Ray Manzarek - keyboards, vocals
 Paul Warren - guitar, lead vocals
 Nigel Harrison - bass
 Jimmy Hunter - drums, backing vocals
Technical
Leonard Kovner - engineer

References

1978 albums
Nite City albums
Albums produced by Ray Manzarek
20th Century Fox Records albums